Noise rock (sometimes called noise punk) is a noise-oriented style of experimental rock that spun off from punk rock in the 1980s. Drawing on movements such as minimalism, industrial music, and New York hardcore, artists indulge in extreme levels of distortion through the use of electric guitars and, less frequently, electronic instrumentation, either to provide percussive sounds or to contribute to the overall arrangement.

Some groups are tied to song structures, such as Sonic Youth. Although they are not representative of the entire genre, they helped popularize noise rock among alternative rock audiences by incorporating melodies into their droning textures of sound, which set a template that numerous other groups followed. Other early noise rock bands were Big Black and Swans.

Characteristics 
Noise rock fuses rock to noise, usually with recognizable "rock" instrumentation, but with greater use of distortion and electronic effects, varying degrees of atonality, improvisation, and white noise. One notable band of this genre is Sonic Youth, who took inspiration from the no wave composers Glenn Branca and Rhys Chatham. Sonic Youth's Thurston Moore has stated: "Noise has taken the place of punk rock. People who play noise have no real aspirations to being part of the mainstream culture. Punk has been co-opted, and this subterranean noise music and the avant-garde folk scene have replaced it."

History

Forerunners

While the music had been around for some time, the term "noise rock" was coined in the 1980s to describe an offshoot of punk groups with an increasingly abrasive approach. An archetypal album is the Velvet Underground's White Light/White Heat (1968). Treblezines Joe Gross credits White Light/White Heat as the "cult classic" with being the first noise rock album, accordingly, "perhaps it’s an obvious starting point, but it’s also the starting point. Period."

Red Krayola are another band that were later assessed to be early pioneers of what would become noise rock. Mark Deming of AllMusic remarked that "The Parable of Arable Land exists on a plane all its own; if art-damaged noise rock began anywhere, it was on this album." 

According to legendary rock critic Lester Bangs, The Godz, the New York City-based psychedelic noise band connected to ESP-Disk, can also lay a claim to being among the first of this genre, as demonstrated on Contact High With The Godz (1966), Godz 2 (1967), and The Third Testament of The Godz (1968). Likewise, John Dougan opined in AllMusic: " the three squalling bits of avant-garde noise/junk they recorded from 1966-1968. Sounding like a prototype for Half Japanese or the Shaggs.."

Cromagnon were a 1960s New York City band with their only album Orgasm (1969) being cited by AllMusic's Alex Henderson as foreshadowing noise rock.

Les Rallizes Denudés quickly adopted the noise elements developed by the Velvet Underground in White Light/White Heat and The Velvet Underground & Nico by creating long improvisational songs based on feedback and the use of heavy distortion. The band moved toward an increasingly noise based sound in the 1970s, influencing a great number of artists in the Japanese noise and psychedelic rock scene.

Origins
Guitarist Steve Albini of noise rock band Big Black stated in 1984 in an article that "good noise is like orgasm". He commented: "Anybody can play notes. There's no trick. What is a trick and a good one is to make a guitar do things that don't sound like a guitar at all. The point here is stretching the boundaries." He said that Ron Asheton of the Stooges "made squealy death noise feedback" on "Iggy's monstruous songs". Albini also mentioned John McKay of Siouxsie and the Banshees, saying: "The Scream is notable for a couple of things: only now people are trying to copy it, and even now nobody understands how that guitar player got all that pointless noise to stick together as songs". Albini also said that Keith Levene of Public Image Ltd had this "ability to make an excruciating noise come out of his guitar".

In an article about noise rock, Spin wrote  that a US compilation album titled No New York, released in 1978 on an independent label called "Antilles", was important as it documented the no wave New York scene. It featured several songs of Lydia Lunch's first band Teenage Jesus and the Jerks along with material of other groups such as Mars, DNA and James Chance and the Contortions.

Music
In the 1980s, Big Black, Sonic Youth and Swans were the leading figures of noise rock. Sonic Youth were the first noise rock band to get signed by a major label in 1990. Later notable bands of the noise scene were the Jesus Lizard, Liars, Season to Risk and Unsane.

While noise rock has never had any mainstream popularity, the raw, distorted and feedback-intensive sound of some noise rock bands had an influence on shoegaze, which enjoyed some popularity in the 90s, especially in the UK, and grunge, the most commercially successful. Among them are Wisconsin's Killdozer, Chicago's Big Black, and most notably San Francisco's Flipper, a band known for its slowed-down and murky "noise punk". The Butthole Surfers' mix of punk, heavy metal and noise rock was a major influence, particularly on the early work of Soundgarden.

Starting in the 1990s, noise punk developed mostly as a form of party music, with the band Lightning Bolt serving as key players in the 2000s noise punk scene in Providence, Rhode Island, although Brian Gibson, the bands bassist, is dismissive of the noise punk label, stating "I hate, hate, hate the category "noise-punk" I really don't like being labeled with two words that have so much baggage. It's gross."

See also
 List of noise rock bands
 List of noise musicians

References

Sources
 
 

 
Punk rock genres
Alternative rock genres
Noise music
1980s neologisms
American styles of music
American rock music genres